Pea Reang is a district located in Prey Veng Province, in south eastern of Cambodia.

References 

Districts of Prey Veng province